The players draft for the eighth season of Pakistan Super League was held on December 15, 2022. Before the draft, the teams were allowed to retain a maximum of 8 players and make any transfers.

Background
Ramiz Raja had hinted that the draft will be replaced by an auction but the draft format was retained for the 2023 PSL. The PCB announced that Lahore Qalandars will have the first pick.

Each team had the right to exercise one wildcard pick. Each team had a right-to-match card which allowed franchises to buy back a maximum of one player that they have released on the draft day by paying the respective fee against each category:
 Platinum ($130,000-$170,000)
 Diamond ($60,000-$80,000)
 Gold ($40,000-$50,000)
 Silver ($25,000)
 Emerging ($7,500)

Transfers
Babar Azam and a supplementary round pick were traded to the Peshawar Zalmi from Karachi Kings in return of Shoaib Malik and Haider Ali.

Retained players
On 11 November 2022, the retained player's list was announced. The franchises were allowed to retain a maximum of 8 players from the previous season. All the franchises fully utilized their quota of eight player retentions apart from Peshawar Zalmi.

Draft picks
More than 493 foreign players were registered for the draft. For the emerging category, players should be under 23 as of 1 January 2023 and could have either played less than 10 PSL matches in previous seasons but have not been selected in the national squad.

Replacements
A replacement player draft took place through a conference call on 24 January 2023, in which the franchises were also allowed on their request to pick additional two supplementary players. Peshawar had reserved their pick in the first supplementary round and named Khurram Shahzad as their pick. Lahore and Peshawar reserved their picks in the second supplementary round. Islamabad, Multan, Peshawar and Quetta reserved picks in the replacement draft. Further replacements were announced on 7 February 2023.

References

External links
 

Cricket in Pakistan
Pakistan Super League player drafts
2023 Pakistan Super League